Sarah Murphy may refer to:

 Sarah Murphy (biathlete) (born 1988), New Zealand biathlete
 Sarah Murphy (curler) (born 1986), Canadian curler
 Sarah Murphy (politician) (born 1986), British politician
 Sarah Murphy (swimmer) (born 1975), Zimbabwean swimmer

See also
Sara Murphy (1883–1975), American expatriate art supporter in France